Govindas Vishnoodas Desani (1909–2000), known  as G. V. Desani, was a British-Indian novelist, poet, and social commentator. He was born in Kenya, reared in India and came of age in Britain. Knowledgeable about ancient Eastern spiritual traditions, Desani is best known as the author of All About H. Hatterr (1948), a comic farce which lampooned Anglo and Indian culture and spiritual traditions. An epic-style poetic work, Hali (1950), and its subsequent pairing with his short stories, Hali and Short Stories (1991) made up most of his fiction. Other writings included news reporting, humour and commentary. In later years Desani taught Eastern Philosophy in the United States.

Biography

Early life
Born in Nairobi, Kenya, the son of a well-off wood merchant, he grew up in Sindh, now part of Pakistan. He described himself as a rebellious child who ran away from home three times and, at the age of 13, was expelled from school as unteachable. The third time he left home, he  made it to England where, at 17, he connected with British middle-classes. He was personally recommended by George Lansbury MP, Deputy Leader of the Labour Party, for admission as a reader to the British Museum Library.

By the age of 25, Desani had become a foreign correspondent for The Times of India, Reuters and the Associated Press. He was sponsored by the Central India Railway as a lecturer on antiquities. A circular from the Director of Education, Delhi, stressed the great value of his lectures. It was during this period that he changed the spelling of his last name from Dasani to Desani and, like many writers of the day, started going by his initials: G.V.

He returned to Britain at the beginning of World War II. Waiving their academic requirements, the Imperial Institute, the Council for Adult Education in the British Armed Forces, the London County Council, the Wiltshire County Council, and the Royal Empire Society accepted him as a lecturer and teacher.

Career
Desani lectured at many well-known educational and research institutes including New College, Oxford,  Rhodes House, Trinity College, Cambridge, and the Psychology Laboratory of the University of Amsterdam. He was also a commentator for the BBC. The BBC's The Listener welcomed him as "... a broadcasting discovery ... a voice singular in its beauty." Many of his public lectures were sponsored by the British Ministry of Information. By the end of the war he had become a media personality.

Recalling his rise as an orator in Britain, Anthony Burgess writes that Desani demonstrated "... in live speech the vitality of the British rhetorical tradition, brilliant in Burke and Macaulay, decadent in Churchill, now dead."

All About H. Hatterr and Hali
It was, however, the publication in Britain in 1948 of his multi-cultural novel, with its broad colloquial style, All About H. Hatterr, that attracted wide attention on both sides of the Atlantic and in India. T. S. Eliot said of it, "... In all my experience, I have not met with anything quite like it. It is amazing that anyone should be able to sustain a piece of work in this style and tempo at such length."

All About H. Hatterr broke publicity records for a book published that year (Writer, London). The tone of the reviewers was of surprise and awe (Newsweek, 1951). In the United States, too, Hatterr earned high critical acclaim. Orville Prescott, in his Book of the Week review, in The New York Times, said of it, "... To describe a rainbow to a child born blind would not be much more difficult than to describe the unique character of All About H. Hatterr ... as startling as a unicorn in the hall bedroom. Reading it issues dizzy spells, spots before the eyes, consternation, and even thought." Saul Bellow, also in The New York Times, chose it for his 1952 Book of the Year selection, (calling it) the book "I love". Decades later Salman Rushdie wrote that "Hatterr's dazzling, puzzling, leaping prose is the first genuine effort to go beyond the Englishness of the English language."

Desani's ""Hali: A Play,"" was published in 1950. It was described as "completely different from Hatterr," by T.S. Eliot who – along with E.M. Forster – provided a brief foreword to the 30-plus page booklet. Eliot  called Hali's imagery "... often terrifyingly effective." while Forster wrote, "... It keeps evoking heights above the Summit-City of normal achievement." Other comments were less positive. Eliot added in his foreword, "Hali is not likely to appeal quickly to the taste of many readers." Forster commented, "It depends upon a private mythology – a dangerous device."

Hali and Collected Stories was published in 1991.

Spiritual quest
After his return to India in 1952, he spent nearly 15 years in intense 'spiritual' pursuits. Under guidance of numerous gurus and sadhus, who he sought out based on referrals and reputation, he practiced many forms of mantras and tantric yoga, and experimented with several schools of Hindu and Buddhist thought. According to papers he presented in India, Burma and the U.S., his quest often consisted of living in remote, primitive conditions. His sādhanā's varied. Sometimes he would be holed up in a country house for weeks or months; in another case he was told to walk through a particularly dangerous forest area. Later, he spent several months in intense meditation at a Zen monastery in Japan. Despite this intense study, he once said that he did not "have a Guru franchise".

In 1960, at the invitation of the Burmese Government, he devoted a year to the Panditãrãma Shwe Taung Gon Meditation Center in Rangoon (now Yangon) in the practice and study of ancient Theravada Buddhist techniques.  At the conclusion, he was selected by the Burmese Foreign Office and the Ministry of Religion to address a specially-invited audience of the Diplomatic Corps in Rangoon on Buddhist ethics and techniques. Justice U Chan Htoon, an Associate Justice of the Supreme Court of Burma and the President of the World Fellowship of Buddhists presided.

Social and political commentary
From 1962–67, as a special contributor to the Illustrated Weekly of India (The Times of India group), he published approximately 170,000 words of fiction, contemporary comment, criticism, book reviews and – before leaving for the United States, for a year and a half – wrote an unsigned weekly page called "Very High and Very Low". At that time, he was one of the most widely read and influential journalists in India.
Some of his material was requested for publication in Britain and the States by, among others, the Transatlantic Review and The Noble Savage edited by Saul Bellow.

He was critical of certain policies promoted by Mahatma Gandhi. Unlike Gandhi and Jawaharlal Nehru, who urged Indians not to help the British war effort, Desani encouraged his fellow Hindus to resist German and Japanese enslavement.

Philosophy professorship
In 1967, based on his 15-year-long devotion to spiritual studies, he became a Fulbright Program lecturer on Oriental Philosophy at the University of Texas, Austin. Eventually, he chose to stay and become a tenured professor in the UT Philosophy Department. During the Spring breaks, he taught Theravada Buddhism. In the early 1970s, he became an American citizen. After he retired, in 1978, his health began to fail and he was looked after by some of his former students. He died at the age of 91, at a private home that had been converted to an ashram, near Fort Worth.

Bibliography

Novels

All About H. Hatterr, Aldor, London 1948.
revised edition, Farrar, Straus & Young, New York, 1951.
further revised, Farrar, Straus & Giroux, New York, 1970.
further revised with a new chapter, Lancer Books, New York, 1972.
with further additions and revisions in the Penguin Modern Classics series, Penguin Books, London, 1972.

Short stories and others
 Hali, Saturn Press, London, 1952. (A prose poem.)
 Dozens of signed columns, Illustrated Weekly of India, 1962–67.
 Mainly concerning Kama and her Immortal Lord, Indian Council for Cultural Relations, Government of India, 1973.
 Hali and Collected Stories, McPherson, Kingston, New York, 1991.

References

External links
 G.V. Desani memorial website (desani.org), maintained by former students
 Memorial resolution, University of Texas
 A photo of G. V. Desani
 A conversation with G.V. Desani recorded at UT Austin in July 1989 when he was turning 80 - Part 1
 A conversation with G.V. Desani recorded at UT Austin in July 1989 when he was turning 80 - Part 2

1909 births
2000 deaths
Writers from Nairobi
20th-century Indian journalists
Indian scholars of Buddhism
20th-century Indian short story writers
20th-century Indian novelists